De viaje con los Derbez is a Spanish-language documentary comedy streaming television series co-produced by Lionsgate, 3Pas Studios, and Wallin Chambers Entertainment. It premiered on 18 October 2019 on Amazon Prime Video worldwide, except for United States, and Puerto Rico, where it premiered on Pantaya. The series revolves around the Derbez family on their trips to various destinations.

In May 2022, the series was renewed for a third season, which is set to premiere on 7 April 2023.

Cast 
 Eugenio Derbez, the patriarch of the family
 Alessandra Rosaldo, Eugenio's wife
 Aitana Derbez is Eugenio and Alessandra's daughter
 Vadhir Derbez is Eugenio's oldest son
 José Eduardo Derbez is Eugenio's youngest son with ex-wife Victoria Ruffo
 Aislinn Derbez is Eugenio's eldest daughter with ex-wife Gabriela Michel
 Mauricio Ochmann, Aislinn's then-husband
 Kailani is Aislinn and Mauricio's daughter

Episodes

Series overview

Season 1 (2019)

Season 2 (2021)

Production 
On 4 December 2020, the series was renewed for a second season and premiered on 20 May 2021. On 20 May 2022, Eugenio Derbez announced that the series was renewed for a third season. The third season is set to premiere on 7 April 2023.

References

External links 
 

Mexican television series
Spanish-language television shows
Spanish-language Amazon Prime Video original programming
Amazon Prime Video original programming
2019 Mexican television series debuts